Anatoly Mikhailovich Adoskin (23 November 1927 – 20 March 2019) was a Soviet and Russian actor of theater and cinema. People's Artist of the Russian Federation (1996).

Biography 
Anatoly Adoskin graduated from the studio at the Mossovet Theater under the leadership of Yuri Zavadsky in 1948. At the end of the studio he was invited to the troupe of the theater.

In the movie,  Adoskin made his debut in 1955 —  Two Captains (director Vladimir Vengerov).

In 1961 he moved to the troupe of the Sovremennik. In 1965 he was invited to the Lenkom, and in 1968 he returned to the Mossovet Theater,  where he plays on the stage today.

Selected filmography
 Two Captains (1955) as Valya Zhukov
 The Girls (1961) as Dementyev
 Seven Old Men and a Girl (1968) as Anatoly Sidorov
 The Brothers Karamazov (1969) as examining magistrate
 Moscow-Cassiopeia (1973) as  Pasha's father  
 Teens in the Universe (1974) as  Pasha's father
 Lenin in Paris (1981)  as agitator-menshevik
 Pippi Longstocking (1984)  as director of puppet theatre
 House of Fools (2002) as Fuko
 4 (2004) as Oleg's father

Awards 
Honored Artist of the RSFSR (1981)  
People's Artist of the Russian Federation (1996) 
 Order of Honour (2008)

References

External links
 
 Анатолий Адоскин на сайте театра имени Моссовета
 Анатолий Адоскин — Легенды Ленкома

1927 births
2019 deaths
Male actors from Moscow
Soviet male film actors
Soviet male stage actors
Russian male film actors
Russian male stage actors
Honored Artists of the RSFSR
People's Artists of Russia
Recipients of the Order of Honour (Russia)